The following is a list of prime ministers of New Zealand by education. The list includes all recognised heads of government, the title of which has included colonial secretary, premier, first minister and prime minister, since the establishment of a responsible government in New Zealand in 1856. James FitzGerald or Thomas Forsaith, who lead unofficial ministries in 1854, are not included.

Historically it was not uncommon for New Zealand prime ministers to have little tertiary education, however university attendance has become more common since the 1970s. The most frequently attended university is Victoria University of Wellington with four allumni (Jack Marshall, Geoffrey Palmer, Bill English and Chris Hipkins) having held the office of prime minister, followed by the universities of Auckland, Cambridge, Canterbury and Otago with two alumni each. Only two prime ministers have held doctoral level education (Daniel Pollen and Geoffrey Palmer).

List of New Zealand prime ministers by education

See also
 List of prime ministers of Australia by education
 List of prime ministers of Canada by academic degrees
 List of prime ministers of the United Kingdom by education
 List of presidents of the United States by education

Notes

References

New Zealand 
Lists of prime ministers of New Zealand
New Zealand education-related lists